The musicians listed are active in Iranian hip hop.

References 

Iranian hip hop